Abasolo Municipality is located in Tamaulipas, Mexico.

Municipalities of Tamaulipas